Corno di Rosazzo is a comune (municipality) in the Province of Udine in the Italian region Friuli-Venezia Giulia, located about  northwest of Trieste and about  southeast of Udine.

Corno di Rosazzo borders the following municipalities: Cividale del Friuli, Cormons, Dolegna del Collio, Manzano, Premariacco, Prepotto, San Giovanni al Natisone.

Demographic evolution

References

Cities and towns in Friuli-Venezia Giulia